All Saints High School is a Roman Catholic high school located in Calgary, Alberta operated under the jurisdiction of the Calgary Catholic School District. The school's designated boundaries include the deep south communities of Calgary like Auburn Bay, Belmont, Chaparral, Cranston, Legacy, Mahogany, Seton, Silverado, Walden, Wolf Willow, and Yorkville

History 
The name of the school was chosen by the naming committee which consisted of trustee Mary Martin, Superintendent of Instructional Services Andrea Holowka, Superintendent of Area A Schools Mike Ross, Deacon Vivian Pinto (St. Patrick parish),Father Julian Studden and Father Anthonu Poul (St. Albert the Great parish), parent representatives from six school councils  and the principal Mike Bolder.

References

External links
All Saints High Official Web Site
The Calgary Catholic School District Official Site
Alberta Schools' Athletic Association
Calgary Senior High School Athletic Association

High schools in Calgary
Catholic secondary schools in Alberta
Educational institutions established in 2018
2018 establishments in Alberta